Gold Mouf is the second studio album by American rapper Lute. It was released on October 4, 2021, by Dreamville Records and Interscope Records. The album includes guest appearances from labelmates JID, Cozz, and Ari Lennox, in addition to Little Brother, Saba, Westside Boogie, BJ the Chicago Kid, Blakk Soul, and Devn. The album was executive produced by rapper and manager Big Pooh, and sequenced by rapper Phonte.

Background
The title of the album, Gold Mouf, is the name of Lute's alter ego. He first unveiled the moniker on the song "Under the Sun". In an interview with XXL in 2019, Lute spoke on what he was working on saying:

Singles
On February 4, 2020, he released the  single "GED (Gettin Every Dolla)", which he performed at the halftime show for the Charlotte Hornets on March 7, 2020. On July 6, 2020 he released the single "Life" along with a music video. On May 31, 2021, Lute released the third single, "Myself" featuring Devn. The music video was later released on August 16.

Promotion
On March 23, 2020, Lute released a mini-series on YouTube titled Gold Mouf Chronicles. The series consists of six episodes directed and edited by Alexander Hall. On August 2, 2021, Lute released another series called Gold Mouf Monday's, where he revealed information about the album each Monday leading up to the release date.

Track listing

References

2021 albums
Interscope Records albums
Dreamville Records albums
Albums produced by Marco Polo
Albums produced by J. Cole